Declan Devine (born 15 September 1973 in Derry) is a Northern Irish football manager and former footballer who has played for and managed his hometown club Derry City in the League of Ireland Premier Division. He is the current manager of Bohemians.

Playing career
Devine began his career with Ipswich Town but was unable to make the breakthrough at Portman Road and returned home. Devine then plied his trade with a number of Irish League clubs as well as Derry City and won the Ulster Young Footballer of the Year Award in 1994 when playing for Roy McCreadie's Omagh Town side. Devine was capped right up to U-21 level with Northern Ireland, winning an U-21 cap in a 0–0 draw against Romania in 1994.
He tasted success with Glentoran, helping them to defeat Glenavon in the Irish Cup final in the 1995–96 season. However, at the end of that season Devine moved to the Brandywell for a combined fee of £42,000 which included Liam Coyle, where he provided backup to Tony O'Dowd as Derry City went on to win the title. Devine was restricted to a limited number of appearances and his highest profile appearance was that in the 1997 FAI Cup final. Derry City, aiming for the double, were rocked with the news of the sudden death of the younger brother of Tony O'Dowd just days before the final and Devine stepped up to take his place between the sticks. They were defeated 2–0 by Shelbourne in Dalymount Park on a weekend where football very much took a back seat.
Devine remained at the Brandywell for the start of the 1997–98 season but again found his opportunities limited and returned to Omagh Town. He was on the move again the following season and ended up with Institute, becoming one of the many players who have played for the two clubs in the Derry.

Managerial career
Having stopped playing at the end of the 2001–02 season, Devine became involved in coaching at an underage level. He returned to Derry City as the Youth Development officer in 2003 and was initially involved in the delivery of the community coaching and Football in the Community programmes which were run by the club at that time. The installation of former teammate, Gavin Dykes, as manager in 2003 meant a promotion for Devine and he took on the role of first team coach. Stephen Kenny opted to retain Devine as first team coach when he arrived at the club the following season, and the back room setup, including Paul Hegarty, guided Derry City to successive second-place finishes as well as success in the FAI Cup, League Cup and memorable European runs. Following this success, Kenny lured Devine to join him at Dunfermline Athletic when he left for East End Park and he was appointed first team coach there on 5 December 2006. Devine described the move as a "massive wrench" but felt for personal reasons that he needed to move on. However, after Stephen Kenny's return to Derry City in late 2007, Devine, too followed him back to the club. He was instrumental in guiding the team to the First Division title and a third-place finish in the 2011 season.
Following the departure of Stephen Kenny to Shamrock Rovers in December 2011, Devine was appointed manager of Derry City on 6 January 2012, beating off Willie McStay to land the post. He agreed a two-year deal along with Paul Hegarty who was appointed as his assistant manager. In his first season in charge, the club finished 5th in the league, won the FAI Cup, and were runners-up in the Setanta Sports Cup. In the wake of this success, Devine signed a one-year contract extension to keep him at the club until the end of the 2014 season. At the beginning of his second season in charge, after an opening day defeat to Sligo Rovers, Devine guided his team to a 10-match unbeaten run and top of the table until they were defeated again by Sligo in the second series of fixtures. Devine left by mutual consent at the end of the season despite having qualified for Europe and a 6-0 victory against Limerick. Prior to the 2014 League of Ireland season, Devine was linked with the assistant manager post at champions St. Patrick's Athletic, however he turned this down in favour of becoming an underage coach in the Elite Performance Club NI scheme. Devine, along with former Derry City player Pascal Vaudequin, will work with youth players in the west of Northern Ireland. He returned to managing Derry City in 2019, serving until 2021.

On 14 October 2022, Devine was announced as manager of Bohemians on a 2 year contract.

Honours

As a player
 League of Ireland: 1
 Derry City – 1996–97
 Irish Cup: 1
 Glentoran – 1995–96
Ulster Young Footballer of the Year
Omagh Town – 1994–95

As a manager
 FAI Cup
 Derry City F.C. 2012

Managerial statistics

Managerial record
. Includes competitive games only.

List of seasons
LC = League Cup
SC = Setanta Cup
UCL = UEFA Champions League
UEL = UEFA Europa League

References

1973 births
Living people
Derry City F.C. players
League of Ireland players
Derry City F.C. managers
Institute F.C. players
Glentoran F.C. players
Omagh Town F.C. players
Bohemian F.C. players
League of Ireland managers
NIFL Premiership players
Association football goalkeepers
Sportspeople from Derry (city)
Association footballers from Northern Ireland
Northern Ireland under-21 international footballers
Football managers from Northern Ireland